Easy Come, Easy Go is a studio album of cover versions by English singer Marianne Faithfull, which was released in the EU on 10 November 2008. The album is produced by Hal Willner and features guest appearances from a variety of musicians. It was released as both a standard 10-track CD and a special 18-track edition with a DVD documentary by Anne Rohart under Jean-Baptiste Mondino's artistic direction, with both Faithfull and Wilner commenting on the song selection. A collectible 2-disc vinyl pressing is also available. The album was recorded with Pro Tools in NYC at the Sear Sound Studio.

Release
The EU release on Naive was 10 November 2008.

The album has so far peaked at No. 100 on the UK Albums Chart as reported on The Official UK Chart Company website on 23 March 2009 and became her first album to chart on the U.S Billboard 200 chart since 1990.
The album peaked No. 23 at Australian Top 50 Jazz & Blues Album Year End Chart.

In 2014 it was awarded a gold certification from the Independent Music Companies Association, which indicated sales of at least 75,000 copies throughout Europe.

Track listing
Disc 1:
 "Down from Dover" (originally by Dolly Parton)
 "Hold On, Hold On", with Cat Power (originally by Neko Case)
 "Solitude" (originally by Duke Ellington & Eddie DeLange)
 "The Crane Wife 3", with Nick Cave (originally by The Decemberists)
 "Easy Come, Easy Go" (originally by Bessie Smith)
 "Children of Stone", with Rufus Wainwright (originally by Espers)
 "How Many Worlds", with Teddy Thompson (originally by Brian Eno)
 "In Germany Before the War" (originally by Randy Newman)
 "Ooh Baby Baby", with Antony Hegarty (originally by Smokey Robinson)
 "Sing Me Back Home", with Keith Richards (originally by Merle Haggard)

Disc 2:
 "Salvation", with Sean Lennon (originally by Black Rebel Motorcycle Club)
 "Black Coffee" (originally by Sarah Vaughan)
 "The Phoenix", with Kate & Anna McGarrigle (originally by Judee Sill)
 "Dear God Please Help Me" (originally by Morrissey)
 "Kimbie" (originally by Jackson C. Frank)
 "Many a Mile to Freedom", with Jenni Muldaur (originally by Traffic)
 "Somewhere (A Place for Us)", with Jarvis Cocker (originally by Leonard Bernstein and Stephen Sondheim)
 "Flandyke Shore", with Kate & Anna McGarrigle (traditional, also sung by Nic Jones)

Personnel
Producer – Hal Willner

Musicians: 
Barry Reynolds
Greg Cohen
Marc Ribot
Jim White
Rob Burger

Cover photography and art direction:
Jean-Baptiste Mondino

References

External links
Easy Come, Easy Go official site

2008 albums
Marianne Faithfull albums
Albums produced by Hal Willner
Covers albums